Professor Albert B. Reagan (1871–1936) was an American author and historian of Native American history. He was professor of anthropology at Brigham Young University and documented Native American customs and folklore in New Mexico, Arizona, Minnesota, Colorado, Washington, and Utah, for tribes that include the Jemez people, Navajo people, Ojibwe people, Quileute people, and Ute people.

His extensive notes and research are kept in the L. Tom Perry Special Collections at Brigham Young University.

He published a book, Don Diego, through the Alice Harriman Company in New York in 1914.

References

External links
 The Apache Stick Game at Wikisource
 Reagan's papers at Brigham Young University
 Online text, Don Diego

1871 births
1936 deaths
American male non-fiction writers
Brigham Young University faculty
Historians of Native Americans
20th-century American historians
20th-century American male writers
20th-century American anthropologists